The Casagrandes is an American animated comedy television series developed by Michael Rubiner and Miguel Puga that aired on Nickelodeon from October 14, 2019, to September 30, 2022. It is a spin-off of The Loud House and the second television series in the overall franchise, which follows the adventures of Ronnie Anne, her brother Bobby Santiago, and their family living in the fictional Great Lakes City.

Premise
Having moved to Great Lakes City back in The Loud House episode "The Loudest Mission: Relative Chaos", Ronnie Anne Santiago, her older brother Bobby, and their mother Maria move in with their extended family called the Casagrandes consisting of grandparents Hector and Rosa, aunt and uncle Frida and Carlos, their cousins Carlota, C.J., Carl, and Carlitos, and their pets Lalo and Sergio. Ronnie Anne meets new friends like Sid Chang, expresses more about her relatives, and explores the endless possibilities in Great Lakes City.

Episodes

Characters

 Ronnie Anne Santiago (voiced by Izabella Alvarez)
 Bobby Santiago (voiced by Carlos PenaVega)
 Maria Casagrande-Santiago (voiced by Sumalee Montano)
 Rosa Casagrande (voiced by Sonia Manzano)
 Hector Casagrande (voiced by Ruben Garfias)
 Carlos Casagrande (voiced by Carlos Alazraqui)
 Frida Puga-Casagrande (voiced by Roxana Ortega)
 Carlota Casagrande (voiced by Alexa PenaVega)
 Carlos "CJ" Casagrande Jr. (voiced by Jared Kozak)
 Carlino "Carl" Casagrande (voiced by Alex Cazares)
 Carlitos Casagrande (voiced by Roxana Ortega up to ep. 6, Cristina Milizia from ep. 7 onward)
 Sergio (voiced by Carlos Alazraqui)
 Lalo (vocal effects provided by Dee Bradley Baker) 
 Dr. Arturo Santiago (voiced by Eugenio Derbez)
 Mr. Stanley Chang (voiced by Ken Jeong)
 Mrs. Becca Chang (voiced by Melissa Joan Hart)
 Sid Chang (voiced by Leah Mei Gold)
 Adelaide Chang (voiced by Lexi Sexton)

Production
On March 6, 2018, it was announced that Nickelodeon was developing a spinoff of The Loud House under the working title of Los Casagrandes. On July 2, 2018, it was announced that Nickelodeon officially green-lit the comedy series with a 20-episode order. On February 14, 2019, it was announced that The Casagrandes, formerly Los Casagrandes, would premiere in October 2019.

On May 7, 2019, it was announced that Eugenio Derbez, Ken Jeong, Melissa Joan Hart, Leah Mei Gold, and Lexi Sexton joined the voice cast. Mike Rubiner serves as executive producer, while Karen Malach serves as producer. On September 4, 2019, it was announced that the series would premiere on October 14, 2019. The series is produced by Nickelodeon.

On February 19, 2020, it was announced that the series was renewed for a second season of 20 episodes, which premiered on October 9, 2020. On September 24, 2020, it was announced that the series was renewed for a third season.

On February 17, 2022, Axios reported that Nickelodeon had cancelled the series, though with the characters set to appear more in The Loud House.

Home media

Reception 

The series received a positive reception. Joyce Slaton of Common Sense Media described the series as a "charming Loud House spin-off about Mexican American family." She further noted that cartoon violence only happens infrequently, with differences between characters rarely coming up, and said that while "humor can be slightly vulgar," it is a lot of fun, and is "worth your while."

Ratings 
 

| link2             = List of The Casagrandes episodes#Season 2 (2020–21)
| episodes2         = 21
| start2            = 
| end2              = 
| startrating2      = 0.52
| endrating2        = 0.33
| viewers2          = |2}} 

| link3             = List of The Casagrandes episodes#Season 3 (2021–22)
| episodes3         = 23
| start3            = 
| end3              = 
| startrating3      = 0.41
| endrating3        = 0.18
| viewers3          = |2}} 
}}

Awards and nominations

References

External links

 
 

2010s American animated television series
2010s American children's comedy television series
2010s Nickelodeon original programming
2019 American television series debuts
2020s American animated television series
2020s American children's comedy television series
2020s Nickelodeon original programming
2022 American television series endings
American animated television spin-offs
American children's animated comedy television series
Animated television series about children
Animated television series about families
English-language television shows
Hispanic and Latino American television
The Loud House
Nickelodeon original programming
Nicktoons